C.A.T.S. is an Indian Television series that aired on Sony Entertainment Television in 2000–2001. The series was inspired from American TV Series Charlie's Angels. The main cast features Nafisa Joseph, Kuljeet Randhawa, Malini Sharma and Karminder Kaur. The show was produced by UTV.

Plot
C.A.T.S. like its American counterpart, features three women who work as detectives for a mysterious figure named 'Charlie'. C.A.T.S. stands for Careena, Amrita/Ash and Tanya. The girls are assisted by Charlie's close associate and spy 'Bhonsle'. Charlie is a multi-millionaire who assigns C.A.T.S. a new case every week on the show.

Cast
 Nafisa Joseph as Careena 
 Malini Sharma as Tanya
 Karminder Kaur as Amrita 
 Kunal Vijayakar as Bhonsle
 Ninad Kamat as Voice of "Charlie"
 Kuljeet Randhawa as Ash

Guest appearances
  Aman Verma
 Vijay Aidsani
 Amrita Prakash 
 Deepak Parashar
 Aarav Chowdhary
 Kishori Shahane 
 Rajeev Verma
 Abhay Bhargava
 Vrajesh Hirjee 
 Beena Banerjee
 Vaishnavi Mahant 
 Prithvi Zutshi

References

External links

2000 Indian television series debuts
Detective television series
Sony Entertainment Television original programming
UTV Television